Roque Nublo (Clouded Rock, Rock in the Clouds) is a volcanic rock on the island of Gran Canaria, Canary Islands, Spain. The Roque Nublo is the third altitude of the island of Gran Canaria, after the Morro de la Agujereada with 1,956 meters, and the Pico de las Nieves with 1,949 meters.

It was formed by a volcanic eruption around 4.5 million years ago.

Location
Next to the Roque Nublo are other unique rock formations, such as the so-called Roque del Fraile and La Rana .

References

External links

 

Landforms of Gran Canaria
Mountains of the Canary Islands
Nublo, Roque
Nublo, Roque
Pliocene volcanoes